Rinzia orientalis, commonly known as desert heath-myrtle, is a species of flowering plant in the family Myrtaceae and is endemic to south-eastern Australia. It is a shrub with elliptic to narrowly oblong leaves and white or pale pink flowers usually with ten stamens.

Description

Taxonomy
The species was first formally described in 1838 by John Lindley who gave it the name Baeckea crassifolia in Thomas Mitchell's book Three Expeditions into the interior of Eastern Australia. In 2017, Barbara Lynette Rye changed the name to Rinzia orientalis in the journal Nuytsia. (The name Rinzia crassifolia was not available, because it had already been applied by Nikolai Turczaninow to a different taxon.) The specific epithet (orientalis) means "pertaining to the east" referring to the species' distribution compared to other members of the genus.

Distribution and habitat
Desert myrtle-heath grows in mallee scrub on sand dunes and sandplains from the Eyre Peninsula and Kangaroo Island in South Australia to south-western New South Wales and to near Ballarat in Victoria.

References

Flora of New South Wales
Flora of South Australia
Flora of Victoria (Australia)
Plants described in 1838
Taxa named by John Lindley